The South American Under-17 Championship for Men is a basketball tournament held about every two years among the ten countries of South America and is organized in part by FIBA Americas.  The tournament serves as a gateway to the FIBA Americas Under-18 Championship.  Through 2013, the tournament had been held 22 times.

Summaries

Performances by nation

Participation details

See also
FIBA South America Under-15 Championship
FIBA South America Under-21 Championship

External links
Brazil history

Under-17
South
Basketball U17